Doi Kaeo is a tambon (subdistrict) of Chom Thong District, in Chiang Mai Province, Thailand. In 2005, it had a population of 5,128 people. The tambon contains nine villages.

References

Tambon of Chiang Mai province
Populated places in Chiang Mai province